Kes? Mis? Kus? is a series of annual yearbooks published in Estonia reflecting the events in the world and in Estonia from September to October  (except the 2001 yearbook, which began in January 2000). The editor is Enno Tammer.

References

External links
 Search Library's website

Estonian books
Almanacs